Leaf River Township may refer to the following townships in the United States:

 Leaf River Township, Wadena County, Minnesota
 Leaf River Township, Ogle County, Illinois

See also 
 Leaf River (disambiguation)